Berlin Contemporary Jazz Orchestra is the debut album by the ensemble of the same name. It was recorded in May 1989 at RIAS Studio 10 in Berlin, and was released in 1990 by ECM Records. The music was conducted by the group's founder, Alexander von Schlippenbach.

Reception

In a review for AllMusic, Brian Olewnick wrote: "this album... is a good deal less raucous than one might otherwise expect. All three compositions... are only a step or three away from fairly mainstream big band jazz... the... release is solid and reasonably enjoyable, but much less 'contemporary' than one might have hoped."

The authors of the Penguin Guide to Jazz Recordings awarded the album 4 stars, calling it a "superb set," and stated: "Wheeler's 'Ana' is a long, almost hymnic, piece whose mournful aspect nevertheless doesn't soften some powerful soloing... Mengelberg's 'Reef Und Kneebus' and 'Salz' are very much in the line of a post-war Dutch style in which jazz is almost as dominant an element as serial procedures... Thoroughly enjoyable and thought-provoking music."

Writing for Between Sound and Space, Tyran Grillo commented: "This is a full recording, one that accentuates the breezy rhythm section and keeps the brass well separated. The band blows free and easy and tries its best to keep us out of the compositional rut with some freer gesticulations."

Track listing

 "Ana" (Kenny Wheeler) – 22:29
 "Salz" (Misha Mengelberg) – 7:41
 "Reef Und Kneebus" (Misha Mengelberg) – 19:28

Personnel 
 Paul van Kemenade – alto saxophone
 Felix Wahnschaffe – alto saxophone
 Gerd Dudek – soprano saxophone, tenor saxophone, clarinet, flute
 Walter Gauchel – tenor saxophone
 E. L. Petrowsky – baritone saxophone
 Willem Breuker – baritone saxophone, bass clarinet
 Benny Bailey – trumpet
 Thomas Heberer – trumpet
 Henry Lowther – trumpet
 Kenny Wheeler – trumpet, flugelhorn
 Henning Berg – trombone
 Hermann Breuer – trombone
 Hubert Katzenbeier – trombone
 Utz Zimmermann – bass trombone
 Aki Takase – piano
 Misha Mengelberg – piano
 Günter Lenz – bass
 Ed Thigpen – drums
 Alexander von Schlippenbach – conductor

References

 Berlin Contemporary Jazz Orchestra albums
1990 albums
Big band albums
Jazz albums
ECM Records albums